Khiuani Luana Dias (born ) is a Brazilian female artistic gymnast, representing her nation at international competitions.  She participated at the 2007 and 2009 World Artistic Gymnastics Championships in London, Great Britain.

References

1992 births
Living people
Brazilian female artistic gymnasts
Place of birth missing (living people)
Gymnasts at the 2007 Pan American Games
Pan American Games silver medalists for Brazil
Pan American Games medalists in gymnastics
South American Games gold medalists for Brazil
South American Games bronze medalists for Brazil
South American Games medalists in gymnastics
Competitors at the 2006 South American Games
Medalists at the 2007 Pan American Games
21st-century Brazilian women